Elevation is a live album by American saxophonist and composer Pharoah Sanders (containing one track recorded in the studio), released in 1973 on the Impulse! label.

Reception

The AllMusic review by Thom Jurek stated: "This may not rate as highly as some of Sanders' other recordings for the label like Thembi or Karma, but there is plenty here for fans, and it is well worth the investigation and the purchase."  

Brian P. Lonergan of All About Jazz compared the album to Alice Coltrane's Journey in Satchidananda, on which Sanders appeared, noting that it "shares much of the ambiance and sonic palette" of that recording, and stated that it "ventures into some pretty bizarre and wild territory."

A writer for Jazz Impressions singled out "Greeting to Saud" for praise, calling it "a rich soundscape that is both peaceful and meditative," and "a tranquil counterpoint" to the opening track.

Track listing
All compositions by Pharoah Sanders except as indicated
 "Elevation" - 18:01 
 "Greeting to Saud (Brother McCoy Tyner)" - 4:07 
 "Ore-Se-Rere" (Ebenezer Obey) - 5:38 
 "The Gathering" - 13:51 
 "Spiritual Blessing" - 5:41 
Recorded in performance at the Ash Grove in Los Angeles, California on September 7, 1973 (tracks 3 & 4) and September 9, 1973 (tracks 1 & 5) and at Wally Heider Studios in San Francisco, California on September 13, 1973 (track 2)

Personnel
Pharoah Sanders - tenor saxophone, soprano saxophone, shaker, vocals, bells, percussion
Joe Bonner - piano, harmonium, cow horn, wood flute, percussion, vocals
Calvin Hill - bass, vocals, tambura
Michael Carvin - drums, vocals
Lawrence Killian - conga, bell tree, vocals
John Blue (tracks 3 & 4), Jimmy Hopps (tracks 1, 2 & 5) - percussion, vocals
Michael White - violin (track 2)
Kenneth Nash - percussion (track 2)
Sedatrius Brown - vocals (track 2)

References

Impulse! Records live albums
Pharoah Sanders albums
1972 live albums